The Valois Tapestries are a series of eight large tapestries depicting festivities or "magnificences" held by Catherine de' Medici's Royal Courts in the second half of the 16th century. The tapestries were primarily modeled on drawings by Antoine Caron,  but to Caron's distant views of large panoramas crowded with figures much larger portraits of leading persons at the French court have been added in the foreground, usually to the side, as well as elaborate borders.

They were produced by teams of weavers in the Burgundian Netherlands, probably in Brussels or Antwerp, shortly after 1580. A number of great artists and artisans worked on the creation of these tapestries but today we are left with nothing but theories and speculation to their identities. Scholars such as Frances Yates and Jean Coural have developed nuanced theories backed by solid evidence to identify these unknown contributors, and also the political meaning of the tapestries, but research has yet to confirm many of these findings. These works display surprisingly intimate and personal moments within the royal inner circle clashing against the busy backdrops of these lavish festivals.

The tapestries are now in the Uffizi Museum in Florence, Italy.

Design and construction

The tapestries are based on six (possibly eight) designs drawn by the artist Antoine Caron during the reign of King Charles IX of France (1560–1574). These were modified by a second artist, who reveals a strong personality of their own, to include groups of full-length figures in the foreground. Historian Frances Yates believed that this second artist was the influential Lucas de Heere, this claim holds grounds and is backed by solid evidence but is nevertheless highly contested and debated among historians.

Composition 
The eight tapestries can be easily separated into several distinct sections. First the original sketches made by Antoine Caron make up the chaotic backgrounds of each piece. These portions of the tapestries served as the foundations of what was to be created. Laid on top of this chaotic background sit the almost detached portraits later added to the works by the second artist. These serve to further the narrative of the tapestry cycle and further the image of the immediate royal circle. Lastly, we have the immensely detailed borders to each tapestry. These were likely designed by a third artist entirely, employed by the workshop producing the tapestries. The borders of these pieces are extremely understudied, but nonetheless key to determining where and by whom these tapestries were created.

Themes and iconography 
The artists seem to have consulted written accounts of Catherine de' Medici's court festivals. Some of the entertainments recorded in the tapestries can be identified with known events, such as the festivals mounted at Fontainebleau and at Bayonne during Charles IX's royal progress of 1564–65; and the ball held for the Polish ambassadors at the Tuileries in 1573. Particularly lavish were the tournaments and fêtes held in 1565 in Bayonne, near the Spanish border of France, where Catherine de' Medici met with her daughter Elisabeth, Queen of Spain, amidst rituals of display from both courts. The latest event identifiable in the tapestries was held in 1573 at the Tuileries, where Catherine laid on a ball for ambassadors from the Polish governing council, who had elected her son Henry as king of Poland. The costumes worn by the courtiers in the tapestries have been dated to not later than c. 1580.
For Catherine de' Medici, who masterminded these occasions and may have ordered the tapestries that commemorated them, such entertainments were worth their colossal expense, since they served a political purpose. Presiding over the royal government at a time when the French monarchy was in steep decline, she set out to show not only the French people but foreign courts that the Valois monarchy was as prestigious and magnificent as it had been during the reigns of Francis I and her husband Henry II.

At the same time, she believed these elaborate entertainments and sumptuous court rituals, which incorporated martial sports and tournaments of many kinds, would occupy her feuding nobles and distract them from fighting against each other to the detriment of the country and the royal authority. Catherine also exercised her own creative gifts in the devising of the court festivals. Biographer Leonie Frieda suggests that she, "more than anyone, inaugurated the fantastic entertainments for which later French monarchs also became renowned".

Notable figures
Most of the full-length figures in the foreground of the tapestries are recognizable as members of the French royal family and court. Francis, Duke of Anjou is featured prominently in some of the tapestries, and Catherine de' Medici, dressed in her widow's black, occupies the central position in all of the tapestries except one. Catherine's daughter Marguerite de Valois can also be seen.

One absentee from the tapestries is King Charles IX of France, who was on the throne at the time of the events depicted, but who had died (1574) by the time the hangings were woven. Yates speculates that the Protestant creators of the tapestries deliberately cut him out because of his involvement in the St. Bartholomew's Day massacre of 1572, in which thousands of French Protestants, or Huguenots, were slaughtered on his orders. Caron's original drawings for the tapestries, of which six survive, show Charles IX taking part in the festivities. It is the later artist who removed Charles from the designs and added the figures in the foreground who relate to the court of Charles's successor Henry III.

Descriptions 
The collection of eight tapestries has no formal title, but is usually called the "Valois tapestries" and sometimes the "Fêtes des Valois". The tapestries, none of which has an official name are described and summarized in the table below.

Provenance and preservation
Scholars have not firmly established who commissioned the tapestries or for whom they were intended. It is highly likely that they originally owned by, or given to Catherine de' Medici, but they are not included in the inventory of possessions drawn up after her death. It is likely that Catherine presented them to her granddaughter Christina of Lorraine, in celebration of her marriage to Ferdinando I de' Medici, Grand Duke of Tuscany, in 1589. The tapestries are now in the Uffizi Gallery in Florence, Tuscany, but are not normally on public display.

Records regarding the display of the Valois tapestries after their arrival in Florence are rare, but it is likely that the eight works were rarely displayed and never together.

All eight of the Valois tapestries were extensively conserved by the Uffizi Gallery with donation from The Friends of the Uffizi Gallery, Palm Beach, Florida  in the 21st century. Fundraising for the effort began in 1998, while the conservation and restoration work took three years. The tapestries were cleaned of dust and grime, and portions of the works which were weakened by age or damaged due to pests repaired. Paint applied to the works in the 1700s and 1800s to highlight details was also removed.

In November 2018, six of the eight tapestries – Elephant, Fontainebleau, Journey, Polish Ambassadors, Tournament, and Whale – were displayed for the first time in North America at the Cleveland Museum of Art. It was also the first exhibition of the tapestries since their conservation. The works were hung in gallery with walls of various shapes and heights, similar to how they would have been hung originally. Drawings used to inspire the works and preparatory documents used by the weavers were displayed alongside the tapestries. Full-length portraits of Catherine de' Medici, Henry III of France, and Christina of Lorraine as well as a number of decorative art objects owned by the Medici family were included in the exhibit as well.

Conflicting scholarship 
Yates believes that Lucas de Heere's contribution to the tapestries represented a plea to Catherine de' Medici to send the Duke of Anjou the funds he needed to confront Parma effectively. Historian R. J. Knecht questions this reading and calls the tapestries "an enigma". The reason Henry III and Catherine did not throw the full weight of France behind Anjou's campaign in the Netherlands was that they feared provoking a war with Spain. Knecht asserts that a gift of tapestries, however magnificent, would hardly have changed their minds. More recently, historians Lisa Jardine and Jerry Brotton assess the imagery of the tapestries and "turn Yates's argument on its head", concluding that "the tapestries actually are deeply antithetical to the Protestant, and specifically Huguenot, cause." They argue that the Huguenots are depicted in the tapestries not, as Yates believed, to demonstrate the tolerance of the Valois and offer a vision of different faiths and peoples at peace, but to illustrate the certain defeat of the Protestants at the hands of the Valois. They interpret the inclusion of Turks alongside the Huguenots to indicate that both were regarded as "infidels", an association previously made in the Tunis tapestries for the Habsburg Philip II's marriage to Mary I of England.

Jardine and Brotton also suggest that the Valois tapestries have a clear antecedent in the triumphalist History of Scipio tapestries designed for Francis I by Giulio Romano. Yates believed that the depiction of an elephant in one of the tapestries was based on engravings of Anjou's staged entry into Antwerp. Jardine and Brotton suggest instead that Antoine Caron based his designs for the Elephant tapestry on his own painting Night Festival with an Elephant, which in turn draws on The Battle of Zama from the Scipio tapestries. They also maintain that the political message of those tapestries remained part of the Valois ethos, since the Triumph of Scipio was displayed during the summit meeting between the French and Spanish courts at Bayonne. Knecht urges caution, however. The intent of the tapestries is to glorify the house of Valois; beyond that, he believes, all is speculation.

See also
Catherine de' Medici's patronage of the arts
Catherine de' Medici's court festivals

Citations

Bibliography

Cleland, Elizabeth A.H; Wieseman, Marjorie E; de Luca, Francesca. "Renaissance splendor: Catherine de' Medici's Valois tapestries". Cleveland, OH: Cleveland Museum of Art, 2018.  1935294695 9780300237061 0300237065. 
Ehrmann, Jean; Muller, René; Blunt, Anthony. "Drawings by Antoine Caron for the Valois Tapestries in the Uffizi, Florence". Detroit, MI: Detroit Institute of Arts, 1958.
Federal Register. "Notice of Determinations; Culturally Significant Objects Imported for Exhibition-Determinations: 'Renaissance Splendor: Catherine de Medici's Valois Tapestries' Exhibition." Expanded Academic ASAP, 19 Oct. 2018. http://link.galegroup.com/apps/doc/A558794648/EAIM?u=mnacarlb&sid=EAIM&xid=d0e51151. 
Frieda, Leonie. Catherine de Medici. London: Phoenix, 2005. .
Jardine, Lisa, and Jerry Brotton. Global Interests: Renaissance Art Between East And West. London: Reaktion Books, 2005. .
Jollet, Etienne. Jean et François Clouet. Translated by Deke Dusinberre. Paris: Lagune, 1997. .
Knecht, R. J. Catherine de' Medici. London and New York: Longman, 1998. .
Kociszewska, Ewa. "Woven Bloodlines: The Valois Tapestries in the Trousseau of Christine de Lorraine, Grand Duchess of Tuscany". Artibus et Historiae 73, (2016): 335-363. . 
Sayce, R. A. Review of, "The Valois Tapestries" by Frances A. Yates. The Modern Language Review, Vol. 55 No. 4 (Oct. 1960). 601-602. 
Strong, Roy. Splendor at Court: Renaissance Spectacle and the Theater of Power. Boston: Houghton Mifflin, 1973. .

Walker, D.P. Review of, "The Valois Tapestries" by Frances A. Yates. Comparative Literature, Vol.12 No. 2 (Spring 1960). 178-180. 
Yates, Frances. The Valois Tapestries. London: Routledge & Kegan Paul, 1959; 2nd ed. 1975, reprinted 1999.  .

Flanders
Valois Tapestries

People from Florence
People of the French Wars of Religion
Catherine
Valois Tapestries
European court festivities
Material culture of royal courts
Collections of the Uffizi